Mills of Drum railway station was opened in September 1853 by the Deeside Railway and served the rural area around Park House and Crathes estates at the Mills of Drum or Drum Mills, corn mills, that lay close to the River Dee. The Deeside Railway was taken over by the GNoSR in the 1860s. Mills of Drum only remained open until 1863 as an intermediate station on the Deeside Railway that ran from Aberdeen (Joint) to Ballater. Mills of Drum station was located in Deeside, Aberdeenshire, Scotland.

History 
The short single-platform station was opened in 1853 and stood on the single track line with a level crossing to the west and a toll gate on the nearby road. By 1903 the site had been renamed Mills of Crathes. The station name is recorded on the 1855 maps It stood 13 miles or 21 km from Aberdeen.

The Deeside branch at first was operated by the Deeside Railway. The line became itself became part of the GNoSR and at grouping merged with the London and North Eastern Railway. The line was closed to passengers on 28 February 1966. The line has been lifted and extensive sections form part of the Deeside Way long-distance footpath.

Infrastructure

The station only had a short single platform on the single track line without any sidings or passing loop, etc.

Services
The station was closed after a short life, however the line remained open for passenger services until 1966. Initially three trains a day ran, operated by the Aberdeen Railway, with only one locomotive available. The Deeside Railway purchased its own rolling stock which were in service by summer 1854.

The site today 
The station has been demolished and the track lifted. The Deeside long-distance path runs through the old station site. The Royal Deeside Railway is located at Milton of Crathes down the line towards Ballater.

References

Sources

External links
Film of the station and the Deeside line.

Disused railway stations in Aberdeenshire
Former Great North of Scotland Railway stations
Railway stations in Great Britain opened in 1853
Railway stations in Great Britain closed in 1863